The 2017–18 Pac-12 Conference men's basketball season began with practices in October 2017 followed by the 2017–18 NCAA Division I men's basketball season on November 10, 2017. The conference schedule began on December 29, 2017. The season was the seventh season under the Pac–12 Conference name and the 59th since the conference was established under its current charter as the Athletic Association of Western Universities in 1959. Including the history of the Pacific Coast Conference, which operated from 1915 to 1959 and is considered by the Pac-12 as a part of its own history, this was the Pac-12's 103rd season of basketball.

Arizona won the regular season conference championship by two games over second-place USC.

The Pac-12 tournament was held from March 7–10, 2018 at the T-Mobile Arena in Paradise, Nevada. Arizona defeated USC in the tournament championship. As a result, the Wildcats received the conference' automatic bid to the NCAA tournament.

Arizona, Arizona State, UCLA received bids to the NCAA tournament. The conference achieved an 0–3 record in the Tournament.

Pre-season

Recruiting classes

Preseason watchlists
Below is a table of notable preseason watch lists.

Preseason All-American teams

Preseason polls

Pac-12 Media days
Source:

 October 11–12, 2017  – Pac-12 Men's Basketball Media Day, Pac-12 Networks Studios, San Francisco, Calif.

Early season tournaments

Midseason watchlists
Below is a table of notable midseason watch lists.

Final Watchlists
Below is a table of notable year end watch lists.

Regular season
The Schedule will be released in late September. Before the season, it was announced that for the sixth consecutive season, all regular season conference games and conference tournament games would be broadcast nationally by CBS Sports, FOX Sports, ESPN Inc. family of networks including ESPN, ESPN2 and ESPNU, and the Pac-12 Network.

Records against other conferences
2017-18 records against non-conference foes as of (Dec. 28, 2017):

Regular Season

Record against ranked non-conference opponents
This is a list of games against ranked opponents only (Rankings from the AP Poll):

{| class="wikitable"
|-
! Date !! Visitor !! Home !! Site !! Significance !! Score !! Conference Record
|- style="background:#ffcccc;"
| November 20 || No. 6 Wichita State || California || Lahaina Civic Center • Lahaina, HI ||Maui Invitational  ||L 82–92  || 0–1 
|- style="background:#ffcccc;"
| November 20 || No. 9 North Carolina || Stanford || Maples Pavilion • Stanford, CA ||  ||L 72–96  || 0–2 
|- style="background:#ffcccc;"
| November 23 || No. 7 Florida || Stanford || Veterans Memorial Coliseum • Portland, OR ||PK80  ||L 87–108  || 0–3 
|- style="background:#d8ffeb;"
| November 24 || No. 15 Xavier || Arizona State || Orleans Arena • Las Vegas, NV || Las Vegas Invitational ||W 102–86   || 1–3 
|- style="background:#ffcccc;"
| November 24 || No. 18 Purdue || No. 2 Arizona || Imperial Arena • Nassau, Bahamas || Battle 4 Atlantis ||L 64–89  || 1–4
|- style="background:#d8ffeb;"
| November 24 || No. 21 Saint Mary's || Washington State || | Titan Gym • Fullerton, CA || Wooden Legacy ||W 84–79   || 2–4 
|- style="background:#ffcccc;"
| November 26 || No. 18 Texas A&M || No. 10 USC || Galen Center • Los Angeles, CA ||  ||L 59–75  || 2–5
|- style="background:#d8ffeb;"
| November 26 || No. 7 Texas A&M || Arizona || Talking Stick Resort Arena • Phoenix, AZ || Valley of the Sun Shootout ||W 67–64   || 3–5
|- style="background:#d8ffeb;"
| December 6 || Washington || No. 2 Kansas || | Sprint Center • Kansas, KS || || W 74–65   || 4–5 
|- style="background:#ffcccc;"
| December 9 || Colorado || No. 13 Xavier || Cintas Center • Cincinnati, OH ||  || L 69–96 || 4–6 
|- style="background:#d8ffeb;"
| December 10 || No. 16 Arizona State || No. 2 Kansas || Allen Fieldhouse • Lawrence, KS ||  || W 95–85  || 5–6
|- style="background:#ffcccc;"
| December 10 || No. 12 Gonzaga || Washington || Hec Edmundson Pavilion • Seattle, WA ||  || L 70–97  || 5–7|- style="background:#ffcccc;"
| December 16 || No. 25 Cincinnati || UCLA || Pauley Pavilion • Los Angeles, CA ||  || L 63–77 || 5–8|- style="background:#ffcccc;"
| December 21 || No. 14 Kansas || Stanford || Maples Pavilion • Stanford, CA ||  || L 54–75 || 5–9|- style="background:#d8ffeb;"
| December 23 || No. 7 Kentucky || UCLA || Smoothie King Center • New Orleans, LA || CBS Sports Classic || W 83–75 || 6–9|}

Team rankings are reflective of AP poll when the game was played, not current or final ranking

Conference schedule
This table summarizes the head-to-head results between teams in conference play.

Points scored

Through March 5, 2018

Rankings
The Pac-12 had 3 teams ranked and 1 other receiving votes in the preseason Coaches' Poll & AP Poll. There was no coaches poll during week 2 and officially started voting during week 3.

Head coaches

Coaching changes
On March 15, 2017, California head coach Cuonzo Martin resigned. On March 24, the school hired assistant coach Wyking Jones as the new head coach. On March 16, 2017, Washington fired Lorenzo Romar after fifteen years as head coach. On March 19, 2017, the school hired Mike Hopkins as head coach.

Coaches
Note: Stats shown are before the beginning of the season. Overall and Pac-12 records are from time at current school.

Notes:
 Overall and Pac-12 records, conference titles, etc. are from time at current school and are through the end the 2017–18 season.
 NCAA tournament appearances are from time at current school only.
 NCAA Final Fours and Championship include time at other schools

Post season

Pac-12 tournament

The conference tournament is scheduled for Wednesday–Saturday March 7–10, 2018 at the T-Mobile Arena, Paradise, NV. The top four teams had a bye on the first day, March 7, 2018. Teams were seeded by conference record, with ties broken by record between the tied teams followed by record against the regular-season champion, if necessary.

NCAA tournament

Three teams from the conference were selected to participate: Arizona, UCLA and Arizona State.

 National Invitation Tournament 
Five teams from the conference were selected to participate: USC, Utah, Stanford, Oregon & Washington.

Awards and honors

Players of the Week 
Throughout the conference regular season, the Pac-12 offices named one or two players of the week each Monday.

 Totals per School 

All-AmericansAPFirst Team Deandre Ayton (Arizona) Honorable Mention Aaron Holiday (UCLA)
 Allonzo Trier (Arizona)USBWAFirst Team Deandre Ayton (Arizona)NABCFirst Team Deandre Ayton (Arizona)Sporting NewsFirst Team Deandre Ayton (Arizona)Third Team Aaron Holiday (UCLA)

All-DistrictUSBWADistrict IX: Player of the Year Deandre Ayton (Arizona)District IX: All-District Team Deandre Ayton (Arizona)
 Tra Holder (Arizona State)
 Aaron Holiday (UCLA)
 Jordan McLaughlin (USC)
 Chimezie Metu, USC
 Reid Travis, (Stanford)
 Allonzo Trier, (Arizona)
 Thomas Welsh, (UCLA)NABCDistrict 20First teamDeandre Ayton, Arizona
Aaron Holiday, UCLA
Jordan McLaughlin, USC
Reid Travis, Stanford
Tra Holder, Arizona StateSecond teamAllonzo Trier, Arizona
Noah Dickerson, Washington
Thomas Welsh, UCLA
Chimezie Metu, USC
Justin Bibbins, Utah

Conference awards
Voting was by conference coaches.

Individual awards

All-Pac-12

First Team

 ‡ Pac-12 Player of the Year
 †† two-time All-Pac-12 First Team honoree
 † two-time All-Pac-12 honoree

Second Team

Honorable Mention
 Rawle Alkins (ARIZ, G), Shannon Evans II (ASU, G), Robert Franks (WSU, F), Jaylen Nowell (WASH, G), Dorian Pickens (STAN, G), McKinley Wright IV (COLO, G)

All-Freshman Team

‡ Pac-12 Freshman of the Year
Honorable Mention
 Troy Brown (ORE, F)

All-Defensive Team

‡Pac-12 Defensive Player of the Year
Honorable Mention
Chimezie Metu (USC, F), McKinley Wright IV (COLO, G).

All-Academic team
First Team

‡ indicates player was Pac-12 Scholar-Athlete of the Year
†† two-time Pac-12 All-Academic honoree
††† three-time Pac-12 All-Academic honoree

Second Team

†† two-time Pac-12 All-Academic honoree

Honorable Mention
 Milan Acquaah (WSU, R-Fr.), Robert Cartwright (STAN, R-Jr.), David Collette (UTAH, Sr.), Drew Eubanks (OSU, Jr.), Shannon Evans II (ASU, Sr.), Kodi Justice (ASU, Sr.), Jordan McLaughlin (USC, Sr.), Alex Olesinski (UCLA, R-So.), Kodye Pugh (STAN, R-Fr.), Keith Smith (ORE, So.), Thomas Welsh (UCLA, Sr.)

2018 NBA draft

Home game attendance Bold''' – At or Exceed capacity
†Season High

References